This article lists the winners and nominees for the NAACP Image Award for Outstanding Duo or Group. The award is also often called Outstanding Duo, Group, or Collaboration. Currently Beyoncé holds the record for most wins in this category with eight, including her five awards as part of Destiny's Child.

1980s

1990s

2000s

2010s

2020s

Multiple wins and nominations

Wins

 8 wins
 Beyoncé 

 5 wins
 Destiny's Child

 3 wins
 Boyz II Men
 Kendrick Lamar

 2 wins
 Eddie Levert 
 Gerald Levert 
 Silk Sonic

Nominations

 6 nominations
 Alicia Keys

 5 nominations
 Chris Brown
 Destiny's Child
 The Roots

 4 nominations
 The Black Eyed Peas
 Mary J. Blige
 Boyz II Men
 Sounds of Blackness

 3 nominations
 Babyface
 Toni Braxton
 Kirk Franklin and the Family
 Jay Z
 Mary Mary
 Miguel
 The O'Jays
 Outkast

 2 nominations
 Big Sean
 Chloe x Halle
 Mariah Carey
 Ray Charles
 H.E.R.
 PJ Morton
 New Edition
 Jill Scott
 Justin Timberlake
 Silk Sonic
 TLC
 Pharrell Williams

References

NAACP Image Awards